The 1995 New Brunswick general election was held on September 11, 1995, to elect 55 members to the 53rd New Brunswick Legislative Assembly, the governing house of the province of New Brunswick, Canada.

The Liberals were again victorious.  McKenna's personal popularity allowed the Liberals to maintain a large majority while the Tories managed only 6 seats, while the CoR lost all theirs.  The combined PC-CoR vote exceeded that of the Liberals in an additional 10 ridings (Albert, Fundy Isles, Kings East, Mactaquac, Petitcodiac, Saint John-Fundy, Southwest Miramichi, Victoria-Tobique, Western Charlotte and Woodstock).

Also of note, there were 55 ridings in this election, as opposed to 58 in previous elections.  It was the first time boundaries were redrawn in New Brunswick since 1974.

Background
Valcourt, a popular politician from Edmundston, had served as an MP from 1984 to 1993, and served in the cabinets of Prime Ministers Brian Mulroney and Kim Campbell. The New Brunswick Tories had been in shambles for the better part of a decade. They were shut out of the legislature in 1987, and won only three seats and third place in 1991. The internal meltdown of the CoR party had left them much room on the right, and polls showed that there would be a competitive race.

The election marked the debut of Bernard Valcourt as a provincial politician, and as leader of a reinvigorated Progressive Conservative Party. Frank McKenna sought a third term for his Liberal government, while the Confederation of Regions (CoR) party struggled to survive after considerable internal strife. Elizabeth Weir tried to expand her New Democratic Party's foothold in the legislature.

Results

* Natural Law did not contest the 1991 election.

Candidates
Many new and changed districts were used for the first time in this election as a result of an electoral redistribution.

Legend
bold denotes a party leader
italics denotes a potential candidate who has not received his/her party's nomination
† denotes an incumbent who is not running for re-election
* denotes an incumbent seeking re-election in a new district

Northern New Brunswick

|-
|bgcolor=whitesmoke|1. Restigouche West
||
|Jean Paul Savoie 3,745
|
|Luc LeBrun 3,230
|
|Wendy Martin 200
|
|Marcelle Lamontagne (Natural Law) 93
||
|Jean-Paul Savoie
|-
|bgcolor=whitesmoke|2. Campbellton
||
|Edmond Blanchard 4,831
|
|Florent Jim Levesque 1,207
|
|Louis Renaud 425
|
|Harold I. Hargrove (CoR) 368Laurent Maltais (Natural Law) 93
||
|Edmond Blanchard
|-
|rowspan=3 bgcolor=whitesmoke|3. Dalhousie-Restigouche East
| rowspan=3|
|rowspan=3|Carolle de Ste. Croix 4,006
|rowspan=3|
|rowspan=3|Gail Walsh 743
|rowspan=3|
|rowspan=3|Aurèle Ferlatte 2,753
|rowspan=3|
|rowspan=3|Charles Gendron Stewart (Ind.) 220Chris Jensen (Natural Law) 81
||
|Allan Maher†
|-
|bgcolor=whitesmoke colspan=2 align=center|merged district
|-
||
|Rayburn Doucett†
|-
|bgcolor=whitesmoke|4. Nigadoo-Chaleur
||
|Albert Doucet 4,421
|
|Maxime Lejeune 2,555
|
|Ulric DeGrâce 662
|
|Francine Richard (Natural Law) 126
||
|Albert Doucet
|-
|bgcolor=whitesmoke|5. Bathurst
||
|Marcelle Mersereau 4,956
|
|Graham Wiseman 695
|
|Kim Power 824
|
|William Parker (Natural Law) 88
||
|Marcelle Mersereau
|-
|bgcolor=whitesmoke|6. Nepisiguit
||
|Alban Landry 3,715
|
|Anne-Marie Gammon 1,953
|
|Normand Savoie 690
|
|Andie Haché (Natural Law) 87
||
|Frank Branch†
|-
|bgcolor=whitesmoke|7. Caraquet
||
|Bernard Thériault 4,367
|
|Bernard Haché 1,804
|
|Jean-Marie Nadeau 1,792
|
|Marc Boulay (Natural Law) 68
||
|Bernard Thériault
|-
|bgcolor=whitesmoke|8. Lamèque-Shippagan-Miscou
||
|Jean-Camille DeGrâce 4,124
|
|Paul Robichaud 4,096
|
|Daniel Brindle 222
|
|Gilles Godin 56
||
|Jean Gauvin†
|-
|bgcolor=whitesmoke|9. Centre-Péninsule
||
|Denis Landry 3,448
|
|Roland Mallais 2,749
|
|Pierre Cousineau 373
|
|
|colspan=2 align=center bgcolor=whitesmoke|new district
|-
|bgcolor=whitesmoke|10. Tracadie-Sheila
|
|George McLaughlin 3,803
||
|Elvy Robichaud 4,214
|
|Aldoria Noël 172
|
|
||
|Elvy Robichaud
|}

Eastern New Brunswick

|-
|bgcolor=whitesmoke|11. Miramichi Bay
||
|Danny Gay 3,504
|
|Jim Gordon 3,334
|
|Mary M. Parker 237
|
|Allison Furlotte (CoR) 91
||
|Danny Gay
|-
|rowspan=3 bgcolor=whitesmoke|12. Miramichi-Bay du Vin
| rowspan=3|
|rowspan=3|Frank McKenna 5,089
|rowspan=3|
|rowspan=3|Scott Hickey 2,114
|rowspan=3|
|rowspan=3|Debbie McGraw 617
|rowspan=3|
|rowspan=3|Brian E. Farrah (Natural Law) 92
||
|Frank McKenna
|-
|bgcolor=whitesmoke colspan=2 align=center|merged district
|-
||
|Reg MacDonald
|-
|bgcolor=whitesmoke|13. Miramichi Centre
||
|John McKay 4,081
|
|Paul Dawson 3,803
|
|Terry Carter 353
|
|
||
|John McKay
|-
|bgcolor=whitesmoke|14. Southwest Miramichi
||
|Reg MacDonald* 3,227
|
|Andy Dawson 2,326
|
|Allan Goodfellow 337
|
|Gerald Stewart (CoR) 1,055Gayer Holmes (Ind.) 147
||
|Brent Taylor†
|-
|bgcolor=whitesmoke|15. Rogersville-Kouchibouguac
||
|Kenneth Johnson 3,530
|
|Hermel Mazerolle 2,728
|
|Charles Richard 493
|
|
|colspan=2 align=center bgcolor=whitesmoke|new district
|-
|rowspan=3 bgcolor=whitesmoke|16. Kent
| rowspan=3|
|rowspan=3|Alan Graham 4,318
|rowspan=3|
|rowspan=3|Stéphane Comeau 903
|rowspan=3|
|rowspan=3|John LaBossiere 522
|rowspan=3|
|rowspan=3|Percy R. Beers (CoR) 387
||
|Alan Graham
|-
|bgcolor=whitesmoke colspan=2 align=center|merged district
|-
||
|Conrad Landry†
|-
|bgcolor=whitesmoke|17. Kent South
||
|Camille Thériault 6,313
|
|Charles Ryan 1,774
|
|Clifford Meunier 740
|
|
||
|Camille Thériault
|-
|bgcolor=whitesmoke|18. Shediac-Cap-Pélé
||
|Bernard Richard 6,963
|
|Jean-Claude Bourque 1,006
|
|John Gagnon 543
|
|
||
|Bernard Richard
|}

Southeastern New Brunswick

|-
|bgcolor=whitesmoke|19. Tantramar
||
|Marilyn Trenholme 3,414
|
|Eric Wheeler 654
|
|Berkeley Fleming 844
|
|Julia Stevens 553
|
|
||
|Marilyn Trenholme Counsell
|-
|bgcolor=whitesmoke|20. Dieppe-Memramcook
||
|Greg O'Donnell 6,639
|
|Bernard Lord 2,181
|
|Bernice Butler 577
|
|Robert Henry 177
|
|
||
|Greg O'Donnell
|-
|bgcolor=whitesmoke|21. Moncton East
||
|Ray Frenette 4,466
|
|Brian Donaghy 1,302
|
|Gérard Snow 854
|
|Gerry Fullerton 604
|
|
||
|Ray Frenette
|-
|bgcolor=whitesmoke|22. Moncton South
||
|Jim Lockyer 4,332
|
|Bob Leighton 1,236
|
|Blair McInnis 577
|
|Don Freeman 861
|
|
||
|James E. Lockyer
|-
|bgcolor=whitesmoke|23. Moncton North
||
|Gene Devereux 4,333
|
|Marc LeBlanc 1,139
|
|Mark Robar 608
|
|Cyril Flanagan 945
|
|Michael Boucher (Natural Law) 40
||
|vacant
|-
|bgcolor=whitesmoke|24. Moncton Crescent
||
|Kenneth R. MacLeod 3,832
|
|Barbara Winsor 1,489
|
|Richard Hay 426
|
|Dean Ryder 1,017
|
|Richard Mullins 227
|colspan=2 align=center bgcolor=whitesmoke|new district
|-
|bgcolor=whitesmoke|25. Petitcodiac
||
|Hollis Steeves 2,398
|
|Charles Harmer 1,650
|
|Jennifer Stairs 310
|
|Tom Taylor 1,673
|
|
||
|Dennis Cochrane†
|-
|bgcolor=whitesmoke|26. Riverview
||
|Al Kavanaugh 4,090
|
|Scott MacGregor 1,712
|
|David Bailie 317
|
|Doug Roper 1,436
|
|
||
|Gordon Wilden*
|-
|bgcolor=whitesmoke|27. Albert
||
|Harry Doyle 2,871
|
|Wayne Steeves 1,964
|
|Elizabeth Venart 353
|
|Doug Duff 1,350
|
|
||
|Beverly Brine†
|-
|bgcolor=whitesmoke|28. Kings East
||
|LeRoy Armstrong 3,074
|
|Hazen Myers 3,030
|
|Brian Stone 325
|
|Gordon Willden* 548
|
|Brian A. Chown (Ind.) 193
||
|Hazen Myers
|}

Greater Saint John & Fundy Coast

|-
|bgcolor=whitesmoke|29. Hampton-Belleisle
||
|Georgie Day* 3,310
|
|Ronald Hatfield 2,837
|
|Shirley Short 870
|
|Ben Macaulay 456
|
|Neil Dickie (Natural Law) 69
|colspan=2 align=center bgcolor=whitesmoke|new district
|-
|bgcolor=whitesmoke|30. Kennebecasis
||
|Peter LeBlanc 3,279
|
|John van Kralingen 2,069
|
|Elizabeth Thompson 1,522
|
|Bob Ross 471
|
|
|colspan=2 align=center bgcolor=whitesmoke|new district
|-
|bgcolor=whitesmoke|31. Saint John-Fundy
||
|Stuart Jamieson 2,447
|
|Rodney Weston 2,263
|
|Aubrey Fougere 968
|
|Bernard Toole 224
|
|Phyllis Johnston (Natural Law) 49
||
|Stuart Jamieson
|-
|bgcolor=whitesmoke|32. Saint John-Kings
||
|Laureen Jarrett 3,176
|
|Bill Artiss 2,561
|
|Pam Coates 825
|
|
|
|Gary Ewart (Ind.) 497Allison Pring (Natural Law) 60
|colspan=2 align=center bgcolor=whitesmoke|new district
|-
|bgcolor=whitesmoke|33. Saint John Champlain
||
|Roly MacIntyre 2,222
|
|Lisa Keenan 1,547
|
|Paula Tippett 1,888
|
|Christina Green 200
|
|
||
|George Jenkins†
|-
|rowspan=3 bgcolor=whitesmoke|34. Saint John Harbour
|rowspan=3|
|rowspan=3|Robert A. Higgins 1,813
|rowspan=3|
|rowspan=3|Lloyd Betts 702
| rowspan=3|
|rowspan=3|Elizabeth Weir 2,901
|rowspan=3|
|rowspan=3|Roland Griffith 137
|rowspan=3|
|rowspan=3|Janice MacMillan (Natural Law) 52
||
|John Mooney†
|-
|bgcolor=whitesmoke colspan=2 align=center|merged district
|-
||
|Elizabeth Weir
|-
|rowspan=3 bgcolor=whitesmoke|35. Saint John Portland
| rowspan=3|
|rowspan=3|Leo McAdam 2,454
|rowspan=3|
|rowspan=3|Trevor Holder 2,113
|rowspan=3|
|rowspan=3|Greg Barry 1,507
|rowspan=3|
|rowspan=3|Terry Van Duzee 209
|rowspan=3|
|rowspan=3|
||
|Leo McAdam
|-
|bgcolor=whitesmoke colspan=2 align=center|merged district
|-
||
|Shirley Dysart†
|-
|bgcolor=whitesmoke|36. Saint John Lancaster
||
|Jane Barry 2,954
|
|Norm McFarlane 2,673
|
|Kenneth Wilcox 1,030
|
|Peter Whitebone 215
|
|Richard Gerrior (Ind.) 188Christopher Collrin (Natural Law) 49
||
|Jane Barry
|-
|bgcolor=whitesmoke|37. Grand Bay-Westfield
|
|Edward Kelly 1,583
||
|Milt Sherwood 2,332
|
|Julie Dingwell 1,471
|
|Colby Fraser 527
|
|
|colspan=2 align=center bgcolor=whitesmoke|new district
|-
|rowspan=3 bgcolor=whitesmoke|38. Charlotte
| rowspan=3|
|rowspan=3|Sheldon Lee 3,645
|rowspan=3|
|rowspan=3|Sharon Tucker 1,269
|rowspan=3|
|rowspan=3|Eugene Dugas 124
|rowspan=3|
|rowspan=3|Lynn Mason 107
|rowspan=3|
|rowspan=3|Teresa James (Ind.) 54
||
|Sheldon Lee
|-
|bgcolor=whitesmoke colspan=2 align=center|merged district
|-
||
|Eric Allaby
|-
|bgcolor=whitesmoke|39. Fundy Isles
||
|Eric Allaby* 1,201
|
|Bob Jackson 1,111
|
|Bill Barteau 77
|
|John Cunningham 171
|
|
|colspan=2 align=center bgcolor=whitesmoke|new district
|-
|rowspan=3 bgcolor=whitesmoke|40. Western Charlotte
| rowspan=3|
|rowspan=3|Ann Breault 3,076
|rowspan=3|
|rowspan=3|Ken Stevens 1,752
|rowspan=3|
|rowspan=3|John Alexander 257
|rowspan=3|
|rowspan=3|Tony Huntjens 1,590
|rowspan=3|
|rowspan=3|
||
|Reid Hurley†
|-
|bgcolor=whitesmoke colspan=2 align=center|merged district
|-
||
|Ann Breault
|}

Greater Fredericton

|-
|bgcolor=whitesmoke|41. Oromocto-Gagetown
||
|Vaughn Blaney* 3,537
|
|Jody Carr 1,861
|
|Sandra Burtt 390
|
|Ab Rector 914
|
|
||
|Ab Rector
|-
|bgcolor=whitesmoke|42. Grand Lake
||
|Doug Tyler* 3,743
|
|Stephen McCready 2,177
|
|Danny Young 420
|
|Connie Webber 1,501
|
|
|colspan=2 align=center bgcolor=whitesmoke|new district
|-
|bgcolor=whitesmoke|43. Fredericton North
||
|Jim Wilson 4,235
|
|Walter Brown 1,778
|
|Elaine Perkins 1,074
|
|Ross Ingram 1,569
|
|
||
|Ed Allen†
|-
|bgcolor=whitesmoke|44. Fredericton-Fort Nashwaak
||
|Greg Byrne 3,241
|
|Brent Bishop 1,464
|
|Patricia Kennedy 929
|
|Nancy Curtis 857
|
|
|colspan=2 align=center bgcolor=whitesmoke|new district
|-
|bgcolor=whitesmoke|45. Fredericton South
||
|Russ King 4,141
|
|David Peterson 1,980
|
|Dick Grant 1,042
|
|Dave O'Brien 776
|
|Jeanne Geldart (Natural Law) 108
||
|Russ King
|-
|bgcolor=whitesmoke|46. New Maryland
||
|Joan Kingston 3,719
|
|Robert Penney 1,759
|
|Eric Keating 636
|
|Max White* 1,873
|
|
|colspan=2 align=center bgcolor=whitesmoke|new district
|-
|bgcolor=whitesmoke|47. York
||
|John Flynn 3,632
|
|Martin MacMullin 1,815
|
|Mary van Gaal 546
|
|Stephen Little 1,350
|
|Patricia Carlson (Natural Law) 56
||
|Danny Cameron†
|-
|bgcolor=whitesmoke|48. Mactaquac
||
|David Olmstead 3,106
|
|Donald Parent 2,131
|
|Thomas Steep 505
|
|Greg Hargrove 1,755
|
|
||
|Greg Hargrove
|}

Upper Saint John River Valley

|-
|bgcolor=whitesmoke|49. Woodstock
||
|Bruce Smith 3,306
|
|Fred Hanson 3,058
|
|David Kennedy 530
|
|Lynn Avery (CoR) 687
||
|Bruce Smith
|-
|rowspan=3 bgcolor=whitesmoke|50. Carleton
|rowspan=3|
|rowspan=3|Butch Green 3,216
| rowspan=3|
|rowspan=3|Dale Graham 4,016
|rowspan=3|
|rowspan=3|Deanna Grant 220
|rowspan=3|
|rowspan=3|David Kilcollins (CoR) 438
||
|Allison DeLong†
|-
|bgcolor=whitesmoke colspan=2 align=center|merged district
|-
||
|Dale Graham
|-
|bgcolor=whitesmoke|51. Victoria-Tobique
||
|Larry Kennedy 2,845
|
|Greg Inman 2,838
|
|Leslie Ferguson 114
|
|Kevin Jensen (CoR) 592Carter Edgar (Ind.) 109
||
|Larry Kennedy
|-
|bgcolor=whitesmoke|52. Grand Falls Region
||
|Paul Duffie 4,583
|
|Jean-Guy Laforest 2,301
|
|André Faust 264
|
|
||
|Paul Duffie
|-
|rowspan=3 bgcolor=whitesmoke|53. Madawaska-la-Vallée
|rowspan=3|
|rowspan=3|Gérald Clavette 2,908
| rowspan=3|
|rowspan=3|Percy Mockler 3,964
|rowspan=3|
|rowspan=3|Jean-Marie St. Onge 118
|rowspan=3|
|rowspan=3|
||
|Gérald Clavette
|-
|bgcolor=whitesmoke colspan=2 align=center|merged district
|-
||
|Percy Mockler
|-
|bgcolor=whitesmoke|54. Edmundston
|
|Roland Beaulieu 2,803
||
|Bernard Valcourt 4,215
|
|Maureen Michaud 102
|
|
||
|Roland Beaulieu
|-
|bgcolor=whitesmoke|55. Madawaska-les-Lacs
|
|Georges Corriveau 3,085
||
|Jeannot Volpé 4,060
|
|John Nowlan 103
|
|
||
|Georges Corriveau
|-
|}

Elections in New Brunswick
1995 elections in Canada
1995 in New Brunswick
September 1995 events in Canada